Nathaniel Bland (1809 - 1885) was Archdeacon of Aghadoe from 1861 until his death on 25 February 1885. 
A graduate of Trinity College, Dublin, he held curacies at Templenoe and Kilcrohane. He was the incumbent at Knockane from 1851 to 1861; and then of Aghadoe until 1875.

References

Alumni of Trinity College Dublin
Archdeacons of Aghadoe
1809 births
1885 deaths
Clergy from County Kerry
Diocese of Limerick, Ardfert and Aghadoe